Kolonia Borek  is a settlement in the administrative district of Gmina Poczesna, within Częstochowa County, Silesian Voivodeship, in southern Poland.

The settlement has a population of 358.

References

Kolonia Borek